Into No Man's Land is a 1928 American silent war drama film directed by Cliff Wheeler and starring Tom Santschi, Betty Blythe, and Crauford Kent.

Synopsis
A refined criminal keeps his life secret from his daughter. When he gets trouble from the police after shooting one of his underworld associates, he enlists in the US Army and goes to fight in France during World War I. While in France, he serves alongside a young man who is in love with his daughter.

Cast
 Tom Santschi as Thomas Blaisdell / Western Evans 
 Josephine Norman as Florence Blaisdell 
 Jack Dougherty as Clayton Taggart
 Betty Blythe as The Countess 
 Crauford Kent as The Duke 
 Mary McAllister as Katherine Taggart 
 Syd Crossley as Happy

References

Bibliography
 Munden, Kenneth White. The American Film Institute Catalog of Motion Pictures Produced in the United States, Part 1. University of California Press, 1997.

External links

1928 films
1920s war drama films
American war drama films
Films directed by Cliff Wheeler
American silent feature films
American black-and-white films
1928 drama films
1920s English-language films
1920s American films
Silent American drama films
Silent war drama films